Magic Harbor was an amusement park located south of Myrtle Beach, South Carolina that operated from 1954 until the mid-1990s. Originally called PirateLand, it was renamed for its 1975 re-opening with a revamped British theme. The site is now occupied by two campgrounds.

External links
Ride Zone
Defunct parks

Defunct amusement parks in the United States
Amusement parks in South Carolina
Tourist attractions in Myrtle Beach, South Carolina